Ballot Measure 40 was an Oregon ballot measure in 1996. The measure brought sweeping reforms to Oregon's justice system, generally in an effort to promote victims' rights.

Measure 40 passed with 58.8% of the vote, but was overturned by the Oregon Supreme Court in 1998, on the grounds that it contained more than one amendment to the Oregon Constitution.

Measure 40 case precedent has since been cited as the basis for overturning several voter-approved initiatives. Among these are term limits for state office-holders in 2002 and Measure 3, the Oregon Property Protection Act of 2000.

Kevin Mannix, the state legislator behind Measure 40, shepherded many of its provisions through the Legislature as statutory enactments (in Senate Bill 936 of 1997) while Measure 40 was being considered in the courts, placing many of the constitutional provisions of Measure 40 into statutory law.

Armatta v. Kitzhaber 
The 1998 Oregon Supreme Court ruling Armatta v. Kitzhaber was a landmark decision for constitutional amendments. A similar decision in California, Jones, had recently upheld the "single subject rule," which essentially states that a single constitutional amendment measure cannot affect more than one subject in the Constitution.

But the Oregon decision went further, stating that a constitutional amendment cannot affect more than a single clause of the Constitution, even if multiple clauses affect the same subject. The decision has had a significant impact on the way initiative drafters have approached their work in the years since.

Subsequent related measures 
Mannix subsequently brought seven more measures (Measures 69-75) to voters in 1999 via legislative referral, each originally part of Measure 40. All seven would have amended the Oregon Constitution. Four of the measures were approved by voters. Campaigns for these measures were primarily funded by conservative millionaires Loren Parks and Mark Hemstreet.

See also 
 Oregon Ballot Measure 11 (1994)
 List of Oregon ballot measures

References

External links 
 Chief Petitioner Kevin Mannix on BallotPedia.org
 Voters' Pamphlet November 1996 including entry for Measure 40, from the Oregon Secretary of State
 Voters' Pamphlet November 1999 Special Election, includes Measures 69–75 starting on page 12]

Legislatively referred ballot measures
1996 Oregon ballot measures
Penal system in Oregon